In this article the list of television channels in the Tajik language is given. There are no television channels in the Dari language, which is akin to the Tajik language. Also not in the list of television channels in Persian language.

Tajikistan

National channels 
 Tojikiston TV
 TV Safina
 TV Bahoriston
 Varzish TV
 TV Futbol
 Jahonnamo
 Sinamo
 Shahnavoz

Regional channels 
 TV Poytakht
 TV Soghd
 TV Khatlon
 TV Kulob
 TV Badakhshon
 TV ANT
 TV Mavji Oriyono
 TV Mavji Istiqlol
 TV Servis
 TV Alyans

Russia 
 Safo TV (partly in Tajik)

Uzbekistan 
 Samarkand TV (partly in Tajik)
 STV (partly in Tajik)

See also
 List of Persian-language television channels
 Lists of television channels
 Television in Afghanistan
 Television in Iran

Television stations in Tajikistan
Tajik